PD-168,077 is a drug which acts as a dopamine agonist selective for the D4 subtype, which is used for researching the role of D4 receptors in the brain, particularly relating to learning and memory. The propensity to induce penile erections in rats means it could be used for this also?

References

Dopamine agonists
Acetanilides
Phenylpiperazines
Nitriles